Dundarave may refer to:

Dundarave Castle, near Inveraray, Scotland
Dundarave House, a country house in Northern Ireland
Dundarave (West Vancouver) a neighbourhood in West Vancouver, British Columbia, Canada